Doctor on the Boil is a 1970 comedy novel by the British writer Richard Gordon. Bored with his retirement, Sir Lancelot Spratt returns to St Swithan's Hospital to resume his work and disturbs almost everyone else there.

References

Bibliography
 Pringle, David. Imaginary People: A Who's who of Fictional Characters from the Eighteenth Century to the Present Day. Scolar Press, 1996.

1970 British novels
Novels by Richard Gordon
Comedy novels
Novels set in hospitals
Heinemann (publisher) books